Tenth Avenue, also known as Hell's Kitchen, is a 1928 American silent drama film directed by William C. deMille and starring Phyllis Haver, Victor Varconi and Joseph Schildkraut.

Cast
 Phyllis Haver as Lyla Mason  
 Victor Varconi as Bob Peters  
 Joseph Schildkraut as Joe Ross  
 Louis Natheaux as Fink  
 Robert Edeson as Detective Ed Burton  
 Ethel Wales as Ma Mason  
 Casson Ferguson as Curley  
 Ernie Adams as Benny

References

Bibliography
 Goble, Alan. The Complete Index to Literary Sources in Film. Walter de Gruyter, 1999.

External links

1928 films
1928 drama films
Silent American drama films
Films directed by William C. deMille
American silent feature films
1920s English-language films
American black-and-white films
Pathé Exchange films
1920s American films